North Saint Georges Historic District is a national historic district located at St. Georges, New Castle County, Delaware. It encompasses 69 contributing buildings and 3 contributing objects in the village of North St. Georges. The buildings date between about 1719 and 1942 and are primarily residential with a few institutional and commercial buildings.  Notable buildings include the Methodist Church, the St. Georges Historical Society Building, Commodore MacDonough School (1923), Gam's Store (c. 1855), the former African-American school (now the post office, c. 1925), Odd Fellows Lodge (1875), and the Nuttall House. Located in the district are the separately listed St. Georges Presbyterian Church and Sutton House.

It was added to the National Register of Historic Places in 1995.

References

Historic districts on the National Register of Historic Places in Delaware
Historic districts in New Castle County, Delaware
National Register of Historic Places in New Castle County, Delaware
1719 establishments in the Thirteen Colonies